Younés Kaabouni (born 23 May 1995) is a French professional footballer who plays as a midfielder for Sochaux.

Career
Kaabouni made his Ligue 1 debut with Girondins de Bordeaux on 6 October 2013 in 4–1 home win against Sochaux entering the field after 88 minutes for Abdou Traoré. On 31 August 2017, Kaabouni and Bordeaux agreed the termination of his contract.

In January 2019, he signed with Sochaux to play with the reserve team initially and with the goal to join the first team later.

Personal life
Born in France, Kaabouni is of Moroccan descent.

Career statistics

Club

References

External links
 
 

Living people
1995 births
French sportspeople of Moroccan descent
French footballers
Footballers from Bordeaux
Association football midfielders
Ligue 1 players
Ligue 2 players
Championnat National 2 players
Championnat National 3 players
FC Girondins de Bordeaux players
FC Sochaux-Montbéliard players